Juan Luis Bocanegra (born 21 July 1978) is a Guatemalan swimmer. He competed in the men's 100 metre freestyle event at the 1996 Summer Olympics.

References

1978 births
Living people
Olympic swimmers of Guatemala
Swimmers at the 1996 Summer Olympics
Place of birth missing (living people)
Guatemalan male freestyle swimmers
20th-century Guatemalan people
21st-century Guatemalan people